Yarmouth, also known as White House Farm, Brick House Farm, and Eccleston's Hill, is a historic home located at Cambridge, Dorchester County, Maryland, United States. It is a two-story Flemish bond brick structure built above a high basement built about 1730. Also on the property is an 18th-century granary.

Yarmouth was listed on the National Register of Historic Places in 1978.

References

External links
, including photo from 1977, at Maryland Historical Trust

Houses in Dorchester County, Maryland
Houses on the National Register of Historic Places in Maryland
Houses completed in 1730
Cambridge, Maryland
National Register of Historic Places in Dorchester County, Maryland